Praskovya Chernikova (Russian: Прасковья Петровна Черникова; died 1833), was a Russian stage actress and opera singer (mezzo soprano).  She was engaged at the Karl Knipper Theatre in St. Petersburg in 1777-1826, during which she was the leading lady and pioneer member of the first public theatre in St. Petersburg.

References

1833 deaths
18th-century actresses from the Russian Empire
19th-century actresses from the Russian Empire
Russian stage actresses
18th-century women opera singers from the Russian Empire
19th-century women opera singers from the Russian Empire